Babarsa (or Babarsha) is a confection from the Khirpai area of Medinipur district of West Bengal, India.  The origin of this sweet is the site of Kshirpai. This sweet is made with flour and ghee.

Name origins  
In the middle of 1740 to 1750, the peasants attacked the city of Khirpai several times. Residents started leaving the area to escape from the attack of the Chardis. At that time, Edward Babarash, a Sahibabad, was defeated. After this incident, a local trader named Babarasa, who was grateful to Edward, presented food to Edward. Since then, the town has selected this sweet to be on its list of favorite sweets.

According to other sources, this sweet or fresh food was given to Emperor Babur in Delhi. Since then, its name has been Babarasa. However, there is no historical basis for the second theory.

History 
Babasaheb is one of the sweet balls of Bengal. This sweet is about 250 years old.  The origin of these sweets before 1750 originates from the ancient habitation of Midnapur Khirpai. The name of this sweets comes from the name "Edward Babar".

Cooking method 
Originally made from flour, milk and ghee, Babarsa is instead sometimes fried in daladea instead of ghee in the Magygandara market. They are kept in the mold to give it shape, and after this the juice is served at the time of the meal. Earlier, there was a tradition of covering this confection with honey.

Materials 
The materials used in Babarasa are: flour, milk, ghee.

Problems 
Babarsa is on the list of addictive foods, and due to this negative publicity it has produced less business for confectioners, and profits are down. For this reason, many people are leaving the business and going to other professions. As a result, some have predicted that this sweet will gradually become extinct.

Artisans say, "Our family does not live by creating only Babaras. All day work, which is very little in the fee alliance. So there is no interest in this new generation." Earlier, three or four  Babarsa  were sold in the previous money. But as of 2017, the price of 8 rupees or 10 rupees for Babasaheb. It is impossible to sell below the price market. So the buyers are turning away from this sweet. If they get any help from the government, they will get a solution.

References

Bengali cuisine
Sweets of West Bengal
Indian confectionery